Anyaa-Sowutuom is a constituency represented in the Parliament of Ghana. It elects one Member of Parliament (MP) by the first past the post system of election. Anyaa-Sowutuom is located in the Ga Central Municipal District of the Greater Accra Region.

Anyaa-Sowutuom is one of the constituencies that broke away from the now defunct Weija Constituency and includes Ablekuma town. Anyaa Sowutuom is located in the Greater Accra Region of Ghana. The current Member of Parliament is Hon Dr. Dickson Adomako Kissi.

Boundaries 
The seat is located within the Ga West Municipal District of the Greater Accra Region of Ghana.

Members of Parliament

Elections

See also 
 List of Ghana Parliament constituencies
 List of political parties in Ghana

References 

Parliamentary constituencies in the Greater Accra Region